The SBS Invitational was a 72-hole amateur stroke-play team championship played, from 1977 to 2015, between the 15 golf associations of New Zealand. It also acted as the New Zealand Teams Stroke Play Championships. It was permanently hosted at the Invercargill Golf Club in Otatara, Invercargill. It was mostly played in the first weekend of March, although later events were played at other times. It was played for the Macquarie Cup. To celebrate 30 years of the Invitational, a team from Australia was sent to compete in the tournament. The event was axed in 2016 because of scheduling problems.

Format
Played on Saturday and Sunday, a 72-hole team championship with the four lowest scores from each team of five counting in each stroke-play round. The teams included Aorangi, Auckland, Bay of Plenty, Canterbury, Hawke's Bay, Manawatu/Wanganui, North Harbour, Northland, Otago, Poverty Bay/East Coast, Southland, Taranaki, Tasman, Waikato, and Wellington.

Macquarie Cup

 Played over 54 holes in 1977, 1979, 1989 and 2014

Player of the Tournament

 Air New Zealand Cup 1977–2002
 Russell Haywood Memorial 2003–2015

References

External links
Coverage on New Zealand Golf site

Amateur golf tournaments
Golf tournaments in New Zealand